Mittelschmerz (German: "middle pain") is a colloquial term for "ovulation pain" or "midcycle pain". About 20% of women experience mittelschmerz, some every cycle, some intermittently.

Signs and symptoms
Mittelschmerz is characterized by lower abdominal and pelvic pain that occurs roughly midway through a woman's menstrual cycle. The pain can appear suddenly and usually subsides within hours, although it may sometimes last two or three days. In some cases it can last up to the following cycle. In some women, the mittelschmerz is localized enough so that they can tell which of their two ovaries provided the egg in a given month.  Because ovulation occurs on a random ovary each cycle, the pain may switch sides or stay on the same side from one cycle to another.

Other ovulation symptoms
Women may notice other physical symptoms associated with their mittelschmerz, during or near ovulation.  The most common sign is the appearance of fertile cervical mucus in the days leading up to ovulation.  Cervical mucus is one of the primary signs used by various fertility awareness methods.  Other symptoms are sometimes called secondary fertility signs to distinguish from the three primary signs.

 Mid-cycle or ovulatory bleeding is thought to result from the sudden drop in estrogen that occurs just before ovulation.  This drop in hormones can trigger withdrawal bleeding in the same way that switching from active to placebo birth control pills does.  The rise in hormones that occurs after ovulation prevents such mid-cycle spotting from becoming as heavy or long lasting as a typical menstruation.  Spotting is more common in longer cycles.
 A woman's vulva may swell just prior to ovulation, especially the side on which ovulation will occur.
 One of the groin lymph nodes (on the side on which ovulation will occur) will swell to about the size of a pea, and may become tender.

Causes
Mittelschmerz is believed to have a variety of causes:

Follicular swelling: The swelling of follicles in the ovaries prior to ovulation.  While only one or two eggs mature to the point of being released, a number of follicles grow during the follicular phase of the menstrual cycle (non-dominant follicles atrophy prior to ovulation).  Because follicles develop on both sides, this theory explains mittelschmerz that occurs simultaneously on both sides of the abdomen.

Ovarian wall rupture: The ovaries have no openings; at ovulation the egg breaks through the ovary's wall.  This may make ovulation itself painful for some women.
Fallopian tube contraction: After ovulation, the fallopian tubes contract (similar to peristalsis of the esophagus), which may cause pain in some women.
Smooth muscle cell contraction: At ovulation, this pain may be related to smooth muscle cell contraction in the ovary as well as in its ligaments.  These contractions occur in response to an increased level of prostaglandin F2-alpha, itself mediated by the surge of luteinizing hormone (LH).

Irritation: At the time of ovulation, blood or other fluid is released from the ruptured egg follicle. This fluid may cause irritation of the abdominal lining.

Diagnosis
Diagnosis of mittelschmerz is generally made if a woman is mid-cycle and a pelvic examination shows no abnormalities. If the pain is prolonged and/or severe, other diagnostic procedures such as an abdominal ultrasound may be performed to rule out other causes of abdominal pain.

The pain of mittelschmerz is sometimes mistaken for appendicitis and is one of the differential diagnoses for appendicitis in women of child-bearing age.

Treatment
The pain is not harmful and does not signify the presence of disease. No treatment is usually necessary. Pain relievers (analgesics) such as NSAIDS (Non-steroidal anti inflammatories) may be needed in cases of prolonged or intense pain.

Hormonal forms of contraception can be taken to prevent ovulation—and therefore ovulatory pain—but otherwise there is no known prevention.

Usefulness
Women charting with some form of fertility awareness may find mittelschmerz to be a helpful secondary sign in detecting ovulation.  Because normal sperm life is up to five days, however, mittelschmerz alone does not provide sufficient advance warning to avoid pregnancy.  Because other causes of minor abdominal pain are common, mittelschmerz alone also cannot be used to confirm the beginning of the post-ovulatory infertile period.

References

External links 

Noninflammatory disorders of female genital tract
Syndromes
German words and phrases